Thar Peak is a  mountain summit located in the Coquihalla Summit Recreation Area, in the North Cascades of southwestern British Columbia, Canada. Due to its close proximity to the Coquihalla Highway, the mountain attracts skiers to its slopes in winter. Precipitation runoff from the peak drains into tributaries of the Coquihalla River. The mountain was named for the thar, a Himalayan animal, and part of the ungulate names theme for several other nearby peaks that were submitted by Philip Kubik of Vancouver. The mountain's name was officially adopted on February 5, 1976, by the Geographical Names Board of Canada.

Geology
During the Pleistocene period dating back over two million years ago, glaciation advancing and retreating repeatedly scoured the landscape leaving deposits of rock debris. The "U"-shaped cross section of the river valleys are a result of recent glaciation. Uplift and faulting in combination with glaciation have been the dominant processes which have created the tall peaks and deep valleys of the North Cascades area.

The North Cascades features some of the most rugged topography in the Cascade Range with craggy peaks and ridges, deep glacial valleys, and granite spires. Geological events occurring many years ago created the diverse topography and drastic elevation changes over the Cascade Range leading to various climate differences which lead to vegetation variety defining the ecoregions in this area.

Climate

Based on the Köppen climate classification, Thar Peak is located in the marine west coast climate zone of western North America. Most weather fronts originate in the Pacific Ocean, and travel east toward the Cascade Range where they are forced upward by the range (Orographic lift), causing them to drop their moisture in the form of rain or snowfall. As a result, the Cascade Mountains experience high precipitation, especially during the winter months in the form of snowfall. Temperatures can drop below −20 °C with wind chill factors below −30 °C. The months July through September offer the most favorable weather for climbing Thar Peak.

Climbing Routes
Established climbing routes on Thar Peak:

 East Ridge -  Off-trail hiking, easy scrambling
 South Slope - Off-trail hiking 
 Northeast Face - , First ascent 1998
 North Couloir - steep snow, First ascent 2005

See also

 Geography of the North Cascades
 Geology of British Columbia

References

External links
 Weather: Thar Peak
 Thar Peak: YouTube

One-thousanders of British Columbia
Canadian Cascades
Cascade Range
North Cascades
Yale Division Yale Land District